Le Bazar de la Charité (The Bonfire of Destiny) is a French drama miniseries, that debuted on Netflix on 26 December 2019, after airing on French free-to-air channel TF1 during November–December 2019.

Plot

Le Bazar de la Charité (The Bonfire of Destiny) begins with the depiction of a true event, the fire at the Bazar de la Charité in Paris, 4 May 1897, in which 126 people died. Planning to visit the bazaar is Adrienne de Lenverpré (Audrey Fleurot), an upper-class woman who seeks to escape from her marriage to her tyrant husband, Marc-Antoine de Lenverpré (Gilbert Melki), a candidate for the President of the Senate. While Adrienne's niece, Alice de Jeansin, along with her close confidant and maidservant, Rose Rivière, attend the bazaar the fire breaks out. Adrienne, who had entered the event earlier but left to meet her paramour, realizes to her horror that she, too, could have been inside. From there the plot revolves around the aftermath of the conflagration and the lives of the three women.

Cast

 Audrey Fleurot as Adrienne de Lenverpré
 Julie de Bona as Rose Rivière
 Camille Lou as Alice de Jeansin
 Gilbert Melki as Marc-Antoine de Lenverpré
 Josiane Balasko as Madame Huchon
 Antoine Duléry as Auguste de Jeansin
 Florence Pernel as Mathilde de Jeansin
 Théo Fernandez as Julien de la Ferté
 Victor Meutelet as Victor Minville
 François-David Cardonnel as Hugues Chaville
 Stéphane Guillon as Célestin Hennion
 Aurélien Wiik as Jean Rivière

Cast gallery

Turkish version

References

External links
 

French television miniseries
2010s French television series
2019 French television series endings
2010s French television miniseries
Television shows set in Paris
Television series set in the 1890s